Basic Black may refer to:

Basic Black (TV series), American weekly television series airing on WGBH in Boston
Basic Black (radio program), Canadian radio program on CBC Radio
Basic Black: Tales of Appropriate Fear, collection of horror stories by Terry Dowling

See also
Basic Black 2, a soluble dye